Massu may refer to:
Jacques Massu (1908–2002), French general, who fought during World War II, First Indochina War and Algerian War
Nicolás Massú (born 1979), Chilean Olympic champion tennis player
Massu, Lääne County, village in Hanila Parish, Lääne County, Estonia
Massu, Pärnu County, village in Vändra Parish, Pärnu County, Estonia
Massu River, Estonia